These are the official results of the Women's 5000 metres event at the 2003 IAAF World Championships in Paris, France. There were a total number of 33 participating athletes, with two qualifying heats and the final held on Saturday 30 August 2003 at 18:35h.

Tirunesh Dibaba, at 17 years 333 days, is the youngest individual World Champion ever.

Final

Heats
Held on Tuesday 26 August 2003

References

Results–World Athletics
 

H
5000 metres at the World Athletics Championships
2003 in women's athletics